The men's bantamweight event was part of the boxing programme at the 1956 Summer Olympics. The weight class was allowed boxers of up to 54 kilograms to compete. The competition was held from 23 November to 1 December 1956. 18 boxers from 18 nations competed.

Medalists

Results

First round
 Song Soon-Chun (KOR) def. Alberto Adela (PHI), PTS
 Robert Bath (AUS) def. Henry Jayasuriya (CEY), PTS

Second round
 Frederick Gilroy (IRL) def. Boris Stepanov (URS), KO-3
 Mario Sitri (ITA) def. Ahmed Rashid (PAK), PTS
 Owen Reilly (GBR) def. Daniel Hellebuyck (BEL), PTS
 Wolfgang Behrendt (GER) def. Henrik Ottesen (DEN), RTD-2
 Claudio Barrientos (CHI) def. Zenon Stefaniuk (POL), PTS
 Eder Jofre (BRA) def. Thein Myint (BUR), PTS
 Carmelo Tomaselli (ARG) def. Vichai Limcharoen (THA), PTS
 Song Soon-Chun (KOR) def. Robert Bath (AUS), PTS

Quarterfinals
 Frederick Gilroy (IRL) def. Mario Sitri (ITA), PTS
 Wolfgang Behrendt (GER) def. Owen Reilly (GBR), PTS
 Claudio Barrientos (CHI) def. Eder Jofre (BRA), PTS
 Song Soon-Chun (KOR) def. Carmelo Tomaselli (ARG), PTS

Semifinals
 Wolfgang Behrendt (GER) def. Frederick Gilroy (IRL), PTS
 Song Soon-Chun (KOR) def. Claudio Barrientos (CHI), PTS

Final
 Wolfgang Behrendt (GER) def. Song Soon-Chun (KOR), PTS

References

 https://web.archive.org/web/20080912181829/http://www.la84foundation.org/6oic/OfficialReports/1956/OR1956.pdf

Bantamweight